Una bruna indiavolata! is a 1951 Italian comedy film directed by Carlo Ludovico Bragaglia.

Cast
 Silvana Pampanini as Clara 
 Ugo Tognazzi as Carlo Soldi 
 Nando Bruno as Autista del taxi 
 Carlo Sposito as Giulio Scanagatta
 Rocco D'Assunta as Il ladro 
 Luigi Pavese as Commissario 
 Virgilio Riento as Cameriere 
 Nino Milano as Dino 
 Anna Campori as Signora Cartoni 
 Alfredo Rizzo as Finto testimone  
 Ughetto Bertucci as Camionista  
 Liana Del Balzo as Mamma di Giulio  
 Gigi Reder as Cameriere al bar della stazione

External links
 

1951 films
1950s Italian-language films
1951 comedy films
Films directed by Carlo Ludovico Bragaglia
Films set in Rome
Italian comedy films
Italian black-and-white films
1950s Italian films